Jilly Cooper, CBE (born 21 February 1937), is an English author. She began her career as a journalist and wrote numerous works of non-fiction before writing several romance novels, the first of which appeared in 1975. She is most famous for writing the Rutshire Chronicles.

Early life
Jilly Sallitt was born in Hornchurch, Essex, England, to Mary Elaine (née Whincup) and Brigadier W. B. Sallitt, OBE. She grew up in Ilkley and Surrey, and was educated at the Moorfield School in Ilkley and the Godolphin School in Salisbury.

Journalism and non-fiction
After unsuccessfully trying to begin a career in the British national press, Cooper became a junior reporter for The Middlesex Independent, based in Brentford. She worked for the paper from 1957 to 1959. Subsequently, she worked as an account executive, copywriter, publisher's reader and receptionist.

Her break came with a chance meeting at a dinner party. The editor of The Sunday Times Magazine asked her to write a feature about her experiences. This led to a column in which Cooper wrote about marriage, sex and housework. That column ran from 1969 to 1982, when she moved to The Mail on Sunday, where she worked for another five years.

Cooper's first column led to the publication of her first book, How to Stay Married, in 1969, and which was quickly followed by a guide to working life, How to Survive from Nine to Five, in 1970. Some of her journalism was collected into a single volume, Jolly Super, in 1971.

The theme of class dominates much of her writing and her non-fiction (including Class itself), which is written from an explicitly upper-middle-class British perspective, with emphasis on the relationships between men and women, and matters of social class in contemporary Britain.

She was in favour of the Iraq War.

Fiction
As with her non-fiction works, Cooper draws heavily on her own point of view and experiences. For example, her own house is the model for Rupert Campbell-Black's. Both houses are very old, although his is larger; her house overlooks a valley called Toadsmoor, while his overlooks a valley called the Frogsmore. She also draws on her love of animals: dogs and horses feature heavily in her books. Woods, hills, fields, pastures and rivers feature frequently.

Emily
In 1975, Cooper published her first work of romantic fiction, Emily. It was based on a short story she wrote for a teenage magazine, as were the subsequent romances, all titled with female names: Bella, Imogen, Prudence, Harriet and Octavia. In October 1993, seven years after Private Eye had pointed out the similarities, Cooper admitted that sections of Emily and Bella were plagiarised from The Dud Avocado by Elaine Dundy, but said that it was not deliberate.

Octavia
Octavia is one of Cooper's "name" books, which each bear a female character's name, and has been made into a television adaptation. It is set in Britain during the 1970s. The broadcast ITV adaptation was produced with a screenplay which was written by Jonathan Harvey.

One character was modelled on George Humphreys, a Welshman with whom Cooper had an affair in the late 1950s.

The Times noted that Cooper avoids the traditional romantic convention in which the heroine remains a virgin until the last page. Elizabeth Grey found the jokes annoying but still funny, and confessed to falling in love with the character of Octavia.

An excerpt was included in The Dirty Bits For Girls (ed. India Knight, Virago, 2008), a collection of favourite "dirty bits" from novels Knight read as a teenager.

Plot summary
Octavia Brennan is a beautiful yet flawed young woman, living the high life in 1970s London. Though she is deeply flirtatious and has – by her own admission – slept with many men, she has never found happiness with any of them.

After bumping into an old school friend, Gussie, and falling for her fiancé, Jeremy, Octavia is invited to spend the weekend with them on their canal boat. Characteristically, she convinces herself that Jeremy cannot possibly have real affection for the overweight and clumsy Gussie, and she is determined to win Jeremy by the end of the weekend. But when Jeremy invites Welsh firebrand Gareth Llewellyn along for the ride, Octavia finds her plans disrupted in more ways than one.

TV production 
Production began on 17 September 2007, in London. Cooper was invited to make a cameo appearance as a guest at a party. Its broadcast was delayed according to a Broadcast Now article in early 2009 as a consequence of the recession – ITV put many of their dramas 'on ice'; postponing single dramas until later that year. The Guardian reported early in 2009 Octavia had no transmission slots for the forthcoming year and said, for accountancy purposes, its cost would not counted until the show was broadcast. Octavia had its first UK screening in 2009 with Tamsin Egerton taking the title role.

The cast was:
Tamsin Egerton as Octavia Brennan
Patrick Baladi as Jeremy West
Richard Coyle as Gareth Llewellyn
Tom McKay as Xander Brennan
Alice Glover as Lorna Hamilton
Joel Fry as Charlie Mancini

Riders and the Rutshire Chronicles
However, Cooper's best-known works are her long novels. The first of these was Riders (1985), an international bestseller, and the first volume of Rutshire Chronicles. The first version of Riders was written by 1970, but shortly after Cooper had finished it, she took it with her into the West End of London and left the manuscript on a bus. The London Evening Standard put out an appeal, but it was never found. She was, she says, "devastated", and it took her more than a decade to start it again.

Riders and the following books are characterised by intricate plots, featuring multiple story lines and a large number of characters. (To help the reader keep track, each book begins with a list and brief description of the characters.) Although the books do not always follow each other sequentially – Rivals and Polo chronologically overlap, for example – they are linked by recurring characters (chiefly Rupert Campbell-Black, Roberto Rannaldini, and their families) and later books make reference to events of previous books.

The stories heavily feature sexual infidelity and general betrayal, melodramatic misunderstandings and emotions, money worries and domestic upheavals.

Each book of the Rutshire Chronicles is set in a glamorous and wealthy milieu, such as show jumping or classical music. These aspects are contrasted with details of the characters' domestic lives, which are often far from glamorous.

Pandora
Her novel Pandora is not one of the Rutshire Chronicles, but does feature a few characters from the series, and is very similar in style and content. Wicked! follows the same approach, including characters from previous novels and introducing new characters who are relatives, friends or rivals of existing characters. It is set in the fictional county of Larkshire, which borders her other fictional county, Rutshire.

Jump!
Her novel Jump! was released in 2010. It features characters from the Rutshire Chronicles in the world of National Hunt steeplechase racing, and tells the transformation of a mutilated horse (Mrs Wilkinson) into a successful racehorse. After publication, it was revealed that Cooper had named a goat in the book (Chisolm) in order to hit back at the critic Anne Chisholm.

Children's books
Cooper also wrote a series of children's books featuring the heroine Little Mabel.

Personal life
In 1961, she married Leo Cooper, a publisher of military history books. The couple had known each other since 1945 (when Jilly Sallitt was about eight), although they did not marry until she was 24 and he was 27. The couple was unable to have children naturally, so adopted two children. They have five grandchildren. The Coopers' marriage was greatly disrupted in 1990 when publisher Sarah Johnson revealed she and Leo had had an affair for several years, though Jilly and Leo eventually got back together. In the 1980s the couple left Putney, southwest London, for The Chantry, an old manor house in Gloucestershire.

Jilly Cooper was a passenger in one of the derailed carriages in the Ladbroke Grove rail crash of 1999, in which 31 people died, and crawled through a window to escape. She later spoke of feeling that her "number was up" and of being absurdly concerned, due to shock, about a manuscript she had been carrying.

Leo Cooper was diagnosed with Parkinson's disease in 2002. He died on 29 November 2013 at the age of 79. In 2010, Cooper suffered a minor stroke.

Cooper has stated that she is a football fan, and supported Leeds United when she lived in Yorkshire. She is also a supporter of the Conservative Party.

Awards and honours
Cooper was appointed Officer of the Order of the British Empire (OBE) in the 2004 Birthday Honours for services to literature and Commander of the Order of the British Empire (CBE) in the 2018 New Year Honours for services to literature and charity.

On 13 November 2009 she was awarded an Honorary Doctorate of Letters by the University of Gloucestershire at a ceremony in Gloucester Cathedral.

Film and TV productions
In 1971, Cooper created the comedy series It's Awfully Bad For Your Eyes, Darling, which featured Joanna Lumley, and ran for one series.

Television adaptations of Cooper's novels are relatively few but have been accepted by national network ITV.

Apart from Octavia, other productions include the TV mini-series The Man Who Made Husbands Jealous, starring Hugh Bonneville, produced by Sarah Lawson, and Riders.

List of works

Non-fiction
How to Stay Married (1969)
How to Survive from Nine to Five (1970)
Jolly Super (1971)
Men and Super Men (1972)
Jolly Super Too (1973)
Women and Super Women (1974)
Jolly Superlative (1975)
Supermen and Superwomen (1976)
Work and Wedlock (1977)
Superjilly (1977)
The British in Love (1979)
Class: A View from Middle England (1979)
Supercooper (1980)
Violets and Vinegar: An Anthology of Women's Writings and Sayings (1980)
Intelligent and Loyal (1981)
Jolly Marsupial (1982)
Animals in War (1983)
The Common Years (1984)
On Rugby (1984; with Leo Cooper)
On Cricket (1985; with Leo Cooper)
Hotfoot to Zabriskie Point (1985; with Patrick Lichfield)
Horse Mania! (1986)
How to Survive Christmas (1986)
Turn Right at the Spotted Dog (1987)
Angels Rush In (1990)
Between the Covers (2020)

Fiction
Emily (1975)
Bella (1976)
Harriet (1976)
Octavia (1977)
Imogen (1978)
Prudence (1978)
Lisa and Co. (1981; also known as Love and Other Heartaches)

'Little Mabel' series:
Little Mabel (1980)
Little Mabel's Great Escape (1981)
Little Mabel Wins (1982)
Little Mabel Saves the Day (1985)

The Rutshire Chronicles:
Riders (1985)
Rivals (1988; also known as Players)
Polo (1991)
The Man Who Made Husbands Jealous (1993)
Appassionata (1996)
Score! (1999)
Pandora (2002)
Wicked! (2006)
Jump! (2010)
Mount! (2016)

References

External links

Jilly Cooper at the British Film Institute
Jilly Cooper The official books website
Jilly Cooper's Video Newsletter for May 2008 BizView.tv
Jilly Cooper's Video Newsletter for December 2007 BizView.tv
 at 'SBillington.com' 
The queen of chick lit The Guardian, 15 June 2004 – Article about Cooper's writing
Jilly Cooper An interview with Jilly recorded in 2000 by meettheauthor.co.uk

1937 births
British Book Award winners
Living people
People from Hornchurch
Commanders of the Order of the British Empire
People educated at Godolphin School
20th-century English novelists
21st-century English novelists
20th-century English women writers
21st-century English women writers
English women novelists
English women journalists
English romantic fiction writers
Women romantic fiction writers
English women non-fiction writers